Naturns is a comune (municipality) in the province of South Tyrol in northern Italy, located about  northwest of the city of Bolzano.

Geography

Naturns borders the following municipalities: Kastelbell-Tschars, Algund, Lana, Partschins, Plaus, St. Pankraz, Schnals, and Ulten.

Frazioni
The municipality of Naturns contains the frazioni (subdivisions, mainly villages and hamlets) Staben (Stava) and Tabland (Tablà).

History

Coat-of-arms
The shield azure and an equilateral triangle of or. It is taken from that of the old dynasty of the Lords of Nals who lived in the village until 1380. The coat of arms was granted in 1966.

Society

Linguistic distribution
According to the 2011 census, 96.83% of the population speak German, 3.04% Italian and 0.14% Ladin as first language.

Demographic evolution

Places of interest
 St. Proculus Church: built in the seventh century, conserves pre-Carolingian frescos
 Juval Castle: residence of Reinhold Messner, displays different art exhibitions
 Texel Group Nature Park
 Train World
 Erlebnisbad/ Acquavventura Naturno

Events
 Schwalbe-TOUR-Transalp (MTB race in seven stages across the Austrian and Italian Alps)
 Ötzi Alpine Marathon (extreme triathlon/mountain biking, running, ski mountaineering)
 Naturno Pottery Market (international participation, every two years) 
 The Night of Lights (dine under the stars, in July)
 Naturno laughs! (International Summer Comedy Festival) 
 Riesling Wine Festival (Naturno Gourmet Autumn)
 Farmer's Cooking from the Monte Sole (Naturno Gourmet Autumn) 
 Chestnut Festival in Naturno (traditional culinary experience, on Wednesdays in October)

Gallery

Twin towns and sister cities
  Axams in Austria
  Rhein-Pfalz-Kreis in Germany

References

External links
 Homepage of the municipality

Municipalities of South Tyrol